Dromedary is a species of camel.

Dromedary may also refer to:

Places

Antarctica
 Dromedary Glacier

Australia
 Dromedary, Queensland
 Dromedary, Tasmania
 Mount Dromedary, a mountain In New South Wales

United States
 Dromedary Hills, an area of hills in Minnesota

Other uses
 Dromedary (band), an American band
 Dromedary naiad, a species of freshwater mussel
 Dromedary bag, a hydration pack
 Dromedary Jumping-slug, a species of land slug

See also
 Mount Dromedary (disambiguation)